Kaaitara (or Tekaitara) is a village in Kiribati. The current population is 0. It is located on the island of Teraina.

References

Populated places in Kiribati